The Southern California Intercollegiate Athletic Conference (SCIAC) is a college athletic conference that operates in the NCAA's Division III. The conference was founded in 1915 and it consists of twelve small private schools that are located in southern California and organized into nine athletic programs.  Claremont-Mudd-Scripps and Pomona-Pitzer are combined teams for sports purposes.

The SCIAC currently sponsors men's baseball, men's and women's basketball, men's and women's cross country, football, men's and women's golf, women's lacrosse, men's and women's soccer, softball, men's and women's swimming and diving, men's and women's tennis, men's and women's track and field, women's volleyball and men's and women's water polo.

History

A forerunner conference to the SCIAC was the Intercollegiate Football Association of Southern California, which existed in the 1890s.  It included Occidental, Caltech (then called Throop Polytechnic), USC, Chaffey College and Los Angeles High School.

The SCIAC was founded in 1915 with five member schools with the goals to promote amateurism in athletics.  The five founding members, all of whom are still members, are Throop College of Technology (now California Institute of Technology), Occidental College, Pomona College, the University of Redlands, and Whittier College.  Although all five original charter members are still affiliated with the SCIAC, only two, Occidental and Redlands, have had uninterrupted membership.  The acronym SCIAC (standing for Southern California Interscholastic Athletic Council) was in use during 1913 and 1914 until that organization became the CIF Southern Section.

On May 12, 2011, the SCIAC announced that Chapman University would become the ninth member, beginning with the 2011–12 academic year.  The addition of Chapman marks the first expansion of the conference since California Lutheran University joined in 1991. At one time, most of the colleges were the southern California affiliates of various Christian sects such as the Quakers and the Presbyterians.  Today, only California Lutheran University maintains an affiliation with a church.

There are three former members of the SCIAC: University of California, Los Angeles, San Diego State University and University of California, Santa Barbara.  All former members now compete in NCAA Division I athletics.

Chronological timeline
 1915 - The Southern California Intercollegiate Athletic Conference (SCIAC) was founded. Charter members included Occidental College, Pomona College, the University of Redlands, Throop College of Technology (now California Institute of Technology) and Whittier College, effective beginning the 1915-16 academic year.
 1920 - The Southern Branch of the University of California (now the University of California at Los Angeles, or UCLA) joined the SCIAC, effective in the 1920-21 academic year.
 1926 - La Verne College (now the University of La Verne) and San Diego State Teachers College (now San Diego State University) joined the SCIAC, effective in the 1926-27 academic year.
 1927 - UCLA left the SCIAC, effective after the 1926-27 academic year.
 1931 - Santa Barbara State College (now the University of California at Santa Barbara) joined the SCIAC, effective in the 1931-32 academic year.
 1934 - Caltech and Pomona left the SCIAC, effective after the 1933-34 academic year.
 1938 - La Verne and UC Santa Barbara left the SCIAC, effective after the 1937-38 academic year
 1938 - Caltech and Pomona re-joined the SCIAC, effective in the 1938-39 academic year.
 1939 - San Diego State left the SCIAC, effective after the 1938-39 academic year.
 1943 - Whittier left the SCIAC, effective after the 1942-43 academic year.
 1946 - Whittier re-joined the SCIAC, effective in the 1946-47 academic year.
 1947 - Claremont Men's College (now Claremont McKenna College) joined the SCIAC, effective in the 1947-48 academic year.
 1950 - Chapman College (now Chapman University) joined the SCIAC, effective in the 1950-51 academic year.
 1952 - Chapman left the SCIAC, effective after the 1951-52 academic year.
 1958 - Claremont combined with Harvey Mudd College for athletics to become Claremont–Mudd, effective in the 1958-59 academic year.
 1971 - Pomona combined with Pitzer College for athletics to become Pomona–Pitzer, while La Verne re-joined back to the SCIAC, both effective in the 1971-72 academic year.
 1976 - Claremont–Mudd combined with Scripps College for athletics to become Claremont–Mudd–Scripps, effective in the 1976-77 academic year.
 1991 - California Lutheran University joined the SCIAC, effective in the 1991-92 academic year.
 2011 - Chapman re-joined back to the SCIAC, effective in the 2011-12 academic year.
 2020 - Occidental dropped its football program before the start of the 2020 fall season (2020-21 academic year).
 2023 - Whittier dropped its football program after the 2022 fall season (2022-23 academic year).

Member schools

Current member schools
The SCIAC currently has nine full members, all are private schools:

Notes

Former member schools
The SCIAC had three former full members, all were public schools:

Notes

Membership timeline

All-sports champions

See also
List of Southern California Intercollegiate Athletic Conference football standings

References

External links